Parivarthanam is a 1977 Indian Malayalam-language film, directed by J. Sasikumar and produced by N. C. Menon. The film stars Prem Nazir, Srividya, Sripriya and Adoor Bhasi. The film has musical score by M. S. Viswanathan.

Cast
 
Prem Nazir as Madhu 
Srividya as Gracy 
Sripriya as Usha 
Adoor Bhasi as Mathew 
Thikkurissy Sukumaran Nair as Bhaskaran 
Jose Prakash as Father Zacharia 
Manavalan Joseph as Warrier 
Sreelatha Namboothiri as Radha 
Prathapachandran as Father Francis 
Bahadoor as Jayan 
Thodupuzha Radhakrishnan as Prathapan

Soundtrack
The music was composed by M. S. Viswanathan with lyrics by Sreekumaran Thampi.

References

External links
 

1977 films
1970s Malayalam-language films
Films scored by M. S. Viswanathan
Films directed by J. Sasikumar